A list of notable guide dog schools worldwide.

Guide dogs are assistance dogs trained to lead blind and visually impaired people around obstacles. In the United States, the name "seeing eye dog" is only used in reference to a guide dog from The Seeing Eye in Morristown, New Jersey, which has trademarked the term. Guide dog schools are accredited by the International Guide Dog Federation.

Europe
 Associação Beira Aguieira de Apoio ao Deficiente Visual, Mortágua, Portugal
 The Guide Dogs for the Blind Association
 Lara Guide-Dog School Hellas, Xalandri, Greece
 Seeing Dogs Alliance, Surrey, England
 Stiftung Schweizerische Schule für Blindenführhunde
 Fundación ONCE del Perro Guía (FOPG), Spain
 Entrevues, Chiens guides et mobilité, Belgium
The Royal Dutch Guide Dog Foundation (KNGF), The Netherlands

Middle East & Africa
 Israel Guide Dog Center for the Blind
 South African Guide Dogs Association for the Blind

North America

 British Columbia and Alberta Guide Dog Services, Delta, British Columbia, Canada
 Canadian Guide Dogs for the Blind Ottawa, Ontario, Canada
 Dogs with Wings, Edmonton, Alberta, Canada
 Fidelco Guide Dog Fountation, Bloomfield, Connecticut, USA
 Freedom Guide Dogs for the Blind, Cassville, New York, USA
 Guide Dog Foundation for the Blind, Inc., Smithtown, New York, USA
 Guide Dogs for the Blind, San Rafael, California and Boring, Oregon, USA
 Guide Dogs of America, Sylmar, California, USA
 Guide Dogs of the Desert, Palm Springs, California, USA
 Guide Dogs of Texas, San Antonio, Texas, USA
 Guiding Eyes for the Blind, Yorktown Heights, New York, USA
KSDS Inc., Washington, Kansas, USA
 Leader Dogs for the Blind, Rochester, Michigan, USA
 Lions Foundation of Canada Dog Guides, Oakville, Ontario, Canada
 Mira Foundation, Sainte-Madeleine, Quebec, Canada
 Mira Foundation USA, Aberdeen, North Carolina, USA
 OccuPaws Guide Dog Association, Madison, Wisconsin, USA
 The Seeing Eye, Morristown, New Jersey, USA
 Southeastern Guide Dogs, Palmetto, Florida, USA

South America
 Helen Keller Guide Dog School, Balneário Camburiú, Santa Catarina State, Brazil

Asia

Japan
 Chubu Guide Dogs for the Blind Association
 Guide Dog and Service Dog and Hearing Dog Association of Japan
 Hokkaido Guide Dogs for the Blind Association
 Hyogo Guide Dogs for the Blind Association
 Japan Guide Dog Association
 Kansai Guide Dogs for the Blind Association
 Kyushu Guide Dog Association 
 Nippon Lighthouse Guide Dog Training Centre
 East Japan Guide Dog Association
 The Eye Mate, Inc.

South Korea
Samsung Guide Dog School
Korean Assistance Dog Association

Taiwan
Taiwan Guide Dog Association
Huikuang Guide Dog Foundation Taiwan

Singapore
 Guide Dogs Singapore

Oceania

New Zealand
 Royal New Zealand Foundation of the Blind, Newmarket, Auckland

Australia
 Royal Guide Dogs Associations of Australia
 Guide Dogs Victoria, Melbourne, Australia
 Guide Dogs NSW/ACT, New South Wales & Australian Capital Territory
 Guide Dogs SA/NT, South Australia
 Guide Dogs TAS, Hobart, Tasmania
 Guide Dogs WA, Perth, Western Australia
 Royal Society for the Blind, South Australia
 Seeing Eye Dogs Australia

References

External links
 
 
 
 

Blindness organizations
Disability-related lists
Dog welfare organizations
Guide dogs
Lists of schools